Leonardo Morales y Pedroso (January 25, 1887– November 17, 1965) was one of the most prominent Cuban architect in Cuba in the first half 20th century.
In 1900 he entered and attended pre-university studies at De Witt Clinton High of New York, where he obtained a bachelor's degree.
In 1909 he graduated of Bachelor in Architecture from Columbia University. After graduating, he returned to Cuba in 1909 where he worked a time in the local architect firm of Newton & Sola with the architect Thomas M. Newton, who was director of the civil construction section of the Secretary of Public Works during the 2nd American intervention in Cuba.
In February 1910, he returned to the United States and obtained a master's degree (Doctor) in Architecture from Columbia University in the State of New York.
After obtaining his doctorate in architecture he joined in March 1910 the architecture Company Morales y Mata arquitectos, created in 1907 by his elder brother the engineer Luis Morales y Pedroso in association with the master builder Jose F. Mata. In 1917, after having built more than 30 important buildings, they decided to separate from José Mata, who had to stop working because illness and died a short time later. The company changed its name for Morales y Compañia Arquitectos with his brother the engineer Luis Morales y Pedroso as president and Leonardo as Associate together with other 7 architects. He was able to obtain noteworthy real estate commissions partly because of his family's origin, good social connections and social standing in Havana high society (his great-grandfather was the Marques de la Real Proclamación). He was named by the Cuban press of the time as the "Havana's architect" and his architectural style is recognized as the "Morales style".
During 50 years Leonardo Morales y Pedroso received around 250 notable architectural commissions, some of them include:

Some Projects with Morales y Mata Arquitectos :
 Home of Jacinto Pedroso y Hdez, 13th Street and 8th street Vedado La Habana. 1910-1913
 Home of William Lawton, Domínguez street and Santa Catalina Lawton La Habana. 1912
 Vedado Tennis Club, 12th street Vedado La Habana, 1912
 Sociedad Cubana de Ingenieros, Habana Vieja, 1912
 Home of Lily Hidalgo Borges de Conill, Paseo avenue Vedado La Habana, 1914
 Home of Josefina García Pola de Tirso Mesa, 13th Street and D street, Vedado La Habana, 1916
 Banco Mendoza y Cía., Obispo Street N° 305, Habana Vieja, 1916
 Home of Pablo González de Mendoza y Pedroso, Paseo avenue and 15th, Vedado La Habana, 1916
 Home of Antonio Sánchez Bustamante. Paseo avenue and 19th street, Vedado La Habana 1916
 Home of Miguel Arango y Mantilla, 25 street N°301 and M street Vedado La Habana. 1916
 Home of Enrique Pedro y Pérez Miro, 13 street N°601 and C street Vedado La Habana. 1916
Some Projects with Morales y Compañía Arquitectos :
 Head Office of Morales and Company Architectes, Habana Vieja La Habana. 1917-1922 
 Home of José Ignacio Lezama, Vedado La Habana, 1917
 Home of Manuel José Morales, Vedado La Habana, 1917
 Colegio Salesiano (Arts and Crafts), La Vibora La Habana, 1917
 Business and office building of Claudio Mendoza y Arellano. Galeano Street Centro Habana La Habana 1918
 Home of Salvador Guedes, 1920
 Home of Alberto Fowler, Country Club La Habana, 1920
 Home of Andrés Gómez Mena, 7th street and 6th street, Miramar La Habana
 Home of Marqués de Pinar del Rio, 17th street and B street, Vedado La Habana
 Home of Upman, 17th street and K street, Vedado La Habana
 Home of Sebastián Guedes, 13th street and 5th street, Vedado La Habana
 Home of Carlos Nadal, 1921
 Home of Elvira Cil, 1923, 23 street and B street, Vedado La Habana
 Home of George S. Ward, Country Club La Habana
 Compañía de Teléfonos de Marianao, La Habana, 1924
 Colegio de Belén, Havana, Marianao La Habana 1925
 Home of Eduardo Montalvo, 9th street Miramar La Habana, 1926
 Home of Eduardo J. Chibas, 17th Street and H street, Vedado La Habana, 1926
 Compañía Cubana de Teléfonos,Aguila street and Dragones street Centro Habana, 1924-1927
 Home of María Teresa O’Reilly, Condesa de Buenavista, 5th Avenue Miramar. 1928
 Finca Chirgota. 1928
 La Mansion of Mark A. Pollack Cuabanacan, La Habana, 1930
 Luxury dwelling building in San Lazaro street N°470 Centro Habana
 Luxury dwelling building in Malecon Avenue N°507 Centro Habana
 La Sagrada familia Church, Vista Alegre Santiago de Cuba
 San Agustin Church in 37 street, reparto Nicanor del Campo, La Habana, 1939
 Santa Rita Church in 5th avenue, Miramar, La Habana, 1942
 Chapel of Quinta de Santovenia in El Cerro, La Habana
 Corpus Christi Church, 150 A street and 15th street Country Club La Habana. 1949
 Pedroso Bank, Aguiar Street N° 251 and Empedrado street Habana Vieja. 1952
 Hospital (against cancer) Marie Curie, Vedado, La Habana, 1946
 Notre Dame of Fatima Church, 1st Avenue and 6 street Varadero Matanzas. 1953

See also

 Colegio de Belén, Havana
 La Mansión

References

 The Havana Guide - Modern Architecture 1925-1965, Eduardo Luis Rodríguez (New York: Princeton Architectural Press, 2000) 
 La Habana, Guia de Arquitectura, María Elena Zequeira & Eduardo Luis Rodríguez Fernandez, editors (Havana, Cuba: Ciudad de La Habana Provincial de Planificacion Fisica y Arquitectura, 1998) 
 La Habana Arquitectura del Siglo XX, Eduardo Luis Rodríguez (Blume, 2001)  
 Anuario Social de La Habana 1939, Julio de Céspedes & Miguel Baguer, editors (Havana, Cuba: Luz-Hilo, S.A., 1939) 
 Directorio Social de la Habana 1948, Maria R. de Fontanills & Eduardo Fontanills, Jr., editors (Havana, Cuba: P. Fernandez y Cia., S. en C., 1948) 
 Libro de Oro de la Sociedad Habanera 1949, Joaquín de Posada, Eduardo Cidre & Pablo Alvarez de Canas, editors (Havana, Cuba: Editorial Lex, 1949) 
 Libro de Oro de la Sociedad Habanera 1950, Joaquín de Posada, Eduardo Cidre & Pablo Alvarez de Canas, editors (Havana, Cuba: Editorial Lex, 1950) 
 Libro de Oro de la Sociedad Habanera 1953, Joaquín de Posada & Pablo Alvarez de Canas, editors (Havana, Cuba: Editorial Lex, 1953) 
 Registro Social de la Habana 1955, Julio de Céspedes, editor (Havana, Cuba: Molina y Cia., S.A., 1955) 
 Registro Social de la Habana 1958, Julio de Céspedes, editor (Havana, Cuba: Molina y Cia., S.A., 1958) 
 Havana, Disdricts of light, Juan Luis Morales and Xavier Galmiche, editor (Paris, France: Vilo International, 2001)  
 Los palacios telefónicos de La Habana y Madrid, Francisco Javier García Algarra, VIII Coloquio Latinoamericano de Patrimonio Industrial, La Habana, marzo de 2016 
 

1887 births
1965 deaths
Cuban architects
Architects from Havana